Presidential elections were held in El Salvador on 20 February 1977. 

The result was a victory for Carlos Humberto Romero of the Party of National Conciliation, who received 67.3% of the vote. However, the election was characterised by massive fraud, with officials of the National Opposing Union (UNO, an alliance of the Christian Democratic Party, National Revolutionary Movement and Nationalist Democratic Union) intercepting military radio transmissions ordering ballot box stuffing, whilst their election officials were assaulted and ejected from polling stations. According to credible witnesses, in sixteen districts where an honest count was made, the UNO candidate, Ernesto Antonio Claramount Roseville, won around 75% of the vote.

Results

References

Bibliography
Byrne, Hugh. El Salvador's civil war: a study of revolution. Boulder: Lynne Rienner Publishers. (Excellent source of information on FMLN strategies, progression of the war, and impasse that led both sides to the peace agreement.). 1996.
Caldera T., Hilda. Historia del Partido Demócrata Cristiano de El Salvador. Tegucigalpa: Instituto Centroamericano de Estudios Políticos. 1983.
Political Handbook of the world, 1977. New York, 1978. 
Webre, Stephen. José Napoleón Duarte and the Christian Democratic Party in Salvadoran Politics 1960-1972. Baton Rouge: Louisiana State University Press. 1979.

Presidential elections in El Salvador
El Salvador
President
Election and referendum articles with incomplete results